Valleyheart is the third and final studio album from She Wants Revenge. It was first released on 24 May 2011 through their own label Five Seven Music in the United States.

Track listing

Charts

References

2011 albums
She Wants Revenge albums